Bayatan-e Sukhteh (also Romanized as Bayātān-e Sūkhteh; also known as Bayātān, Bayātūn, Beyātūn, Bīātūn-e Sūkhteh, and Biyatūn) is a village in Zalian Rural District, Zalian District, Shazand County, Markazi Province, Iran. At the 2006 census, its population was 124, in 36 families.

References 

Populated places in Shazand County